Winston M. Dimel (born October 9, 1995) is an American football fullback who is a free agent. He played college football at Kansas State and UTEP.

College career

Kansas State
After graduating high school, Dimel enrolled at Kansas State, where in his first year he redshirted.

After being a redshirt throughout the 2014 season, Dimel started 13 games at fullback, recording 28 rushing attempts for 86 yards and 6 touchdowns. Receiving, he had 8 catches for 261 yards and 2 touchdowns. By the end of the season he earned First-team All-Big 12 (Coaches) and First-team Academic All-Big 12.

In 2016, Dimel started 13 games again at fullback, making 30 rush attempts for 92 yards and 12 touchdowns. Receiving, he had 6 catches for 66 yards. At the end of the season he was named Second-team Academic All-Big 12, First-team All-Big 12 (Coaches) and Third-team All-Big 12 (Phil Steele).

For his last season at Kansas State, Dimel started all 13 games at fullback. He had 19 rush attempts for 63 yards and 4 touchdowns, while recording 8 catches for 91 yards and 1 touchdown receiving. At the end of the season he earned Second-team Academic All-Big 12, Preseason All-Big 12, Third-team All-Big 12 (Phil Steele), and Second-team All-Big 12 (Coaches).

UTEP
After playing with Kansas State he transferred to UTEP, where his father Dana Dimel became the head coach. In his only season with the team, Dimel played in just 6 games. On the ground he had 4 rush attempts for -3 yards and receiving he had 9 catches for 89 yards. At the end of the season he was named to the C-USA Commissioner's Honor Roll.

Profesional career

Seattle Seahawks
After going undrafted in 2019 Dimel was signed by the Seattle Seahawks on May 3, 2019.

Los Angeles Wildcats
On February 25, 2020, Dimel was signed by the Los Angeles Wildcats. He played in 2 games where he had 1 catch for 8 yards. He had his contract terminated when the league suspended operations on April 10, 2020.

Pittsburgh Maulers
On March 10, 2022, Dimel was drafted by the Pittsburgh Maulers of the United States Football League (USFL).

References

Further reading

1995 births
Living people
Pittsburgh Maulers (2022) players
American football fullbacks
Kansas State Wildcats football players
UTEP Miners football players
Seattle Seahawks players
Detroit Lions players
Cleveland Browns players
Los Angeles Wildcats players